Hemidactylus craspedotus, also known as Mocquard's house gecko, frilled gecko, or frilly house gecko, is a species of gecko. It is found in southeast Asia: Malay Peninsula (southern Thailand, Peninsular Malaysia, and Singapore), Tioman Island, Sumatra, and Borneo.

References

Hemidactylus
Reptiles of Indonesia
Reptiles of Malaysia
Reptiles of Singapore
Reptiles of Thailand
Reptiles of Borneo
Fauna of Sumatra
Reptiles described in 1890
Taxa named by François Mocquard